The Pakistan cricket team toured New Zealand in January 2018 to play five One Day Internationals (ODIs) and three Twenty20 International (T20I) matches. New Zealand won the ODI series 5-0, their second ever 5-0 bilateral series win, the first being against the West Indies in 2000. Pakistan won the T20I series 2–1. It was Pakistan's first T20I series win in New Zealand and as a result, Pakistan moved to the top of the ICC T20I Championship rankings.

Squads

Doug Bracewell was ruled out of New Zealand's squad for the first two ODIs with a hamstring strain and was replaced by George Worker. Worker was then replaced by Colin de Grandhomme in New Zealand's squad for the final three ODIs.

For the final ODI, Trent Boult was rested and replaced by Seth Rance in New Zealand’s squad. For the T20I series, Trent Boult and Lockie Ferguson were selected only for the second and third T20I, Tim Southee was selected for first and third T20I and Ross Taylor was selected only for the first T20I. Pakistan's Shoaib Malik, injured during the 4th ODI, was replaced by Umar Amin for the final ODI. Tim Southee captained New Zealand for first T20I as Kane Williamson was ruled out due to an injury. Ross Taylor and Tom Blundell were added to New Zealand's squad for the last T20I as replacements for Colin Munro and Glenn Phillips, respectively.

Tour match

One-day match: New Zealand XI vs Pakistan

ODI series

1st ODI

2nd ODI

3rd ODI

4th ODI

5th ODI

T20I series

1st T20I

2nd T20I

3rd T20I

Notes

References

External links
 Series home at ESPN Cricinfo

2018 in Pakistani cricket
2018 in New Zealand cricket
International cricket competitions in 2017–18
Pakistani cricket tours of New Zealand